Sukhrauli is a village in Piro block of Bhojpur district, Bihar, India. It is located west of Piro. As of 2011, its population was 1,766, in 256 households.

References 

Villages in Bhojpur district, India